Udea flavofimbriata is a moth in the family Crambidae. It was described by Frederic Moore in 1888. It is found in India, Sri Lanka and Indonesia (Sumatra, Java).

References

flavofimbriata
Moths of Asia
Moths described in 1888